Paila marina is a traditional Chilean seafood soup or light stew usually served in a paila (earthenware bowl). It usually contains a shellfish stock base cooked with different kinds of shellfish and fish. These are complemented with a variety of herbs and spices such as paprika and parsley.

Preparation
Onions, carrots, bell peppers and tomatoes are fried together in a pan before adding the fish and shellfish (with their shells kept on) and frying altogether until juices begin to run. Some recipes then add a selection of shellfish, sometimes canned, with the shells removed, and extras like paprika and white wine.
 
Fish stock is poured over the fried ingredients and the soup is left to simmer until rich and flavorsome. Salt can be added to taste, though it is not always required, as the reduction of the liquid and the presence of the shellfish increase the saltiness of the dish. The soup can be served with a garnish of herbs, such as parsley.

Ingredients

Clams
Chilean mussels
Eels
Machas (from the Pharidae family of mussels)
Tunica rocks
Giant barnacles
Shrimp
Red bell peppers
Onions
Tomato
Fish stock
Parsley
Paprika
Salt and pepper if required
Habanero Peppers (optional and sparingly)
Lemon (on side)

Traditions
It is traditional for groups of friends or family to go to the local seafood market and enjoy a paila marina, especially the morning after a party, when it is believed to aid recovery from a hangover. On January 1, the historic seafood market Mercado Central de Santiago is one of the busiest places in Santiago; Chilean national newspaper La Nación reported that 28,000 people were expected to visit the market on January 1, 2010. Popular belief also ascribes aphrodisiac properties to paila marina.

In popular culture
In the episode "Abiquiu" of the US TV series Breaking Bad, the character Gus Fring, a prominent Chilean methamphetamine distributor in the southwest of the United States, prepares a paila marina for Walter White while explaining the origin of this typical Chilean dish. Gus Fring also prepares a paila marina in the episode "Something Stupid" from the Breaking Bad prequel TV series Better Call Saul.

See also
 List of fish and seafood soups
 List of soups
 List of stews

References

 

Chilean cuisine
Seafood dishes
Stews
Latin American cuisine